Bruce Point is a headland situated at the south side of Charcot Cove on the coast of Victoria Land. It was discovered by the British National Antarctic Expedition, 1901–04, under Captain Robert F. Scott, who named the feature for William S. Bruce, leader of the Scottish National Antarctic Expedition (1902–04).

References
 

Headlands of Victoria Land
Scott Coast